Mohanlal Lallubhai Dantwala (1909–1998) was an Indian agricultural economist, academic and writer, considered by many as the father of Indian agricultural economics. He was a Gandhian and an Indian independence activist and he suffered incarceration for over six years during the Indian freedom struggle. He authored several books and articles on the agricultural sector of India and was the founder chairperson of the Centre For Development Alternatives (CFDA), a research centre promoting development studies. The Government of India awarded him the third highest civilian honour of the Padma Bhushan, in 1969, for his contributions to Indian science and technology.

Biography 
Dantwala was born in Surat, one of the larger cities of the Indian state of Gujarat on 18 September 1909. He did his college studies at MTB Arts College, Surat and Wilson College, Mumbai, winning the James Taylor Prize for academic excellence, after which he worked as a faculty member at the School of Economics of the Mumbai University. It was during this time he got involved in the Indian independence movement and suffered jail terms, intermittently, totaling six and a half years. This caused disruptions in his doctoral studies and his thesis was reportedly submitted while he was serving a jail term at the Arthur Road Jail in Mumbai. Around this time, he also wrote one of his notable works, A Hundred Years of Indian Cotton, a job commissioned by East India Cotton Association and the book had its foreword written by Jawaharlal Nehru.

Dantwala was one of the close collaborators of Mahatma Gandhi and was known to have contributed to the development of the Gandhian ideal of Practical Trusteeship, drafting the proposal document which was published in Harijan in October 1952. After the Indian independence he was associated with several leading political leaders such as Jaiprakash Narayan and Ram Manohar Lohia, assisting them in the formation of Congress Socialist Party. He also served as the private secretary of Morarji Desai for a while and held the chair of the Working Group on Block Level Planning set up by the Planning Commission of India in 1977, which prescribed organizational and operational protocols for socio-economic planning process at block levels. The committee later came to be known as Dantwala Committee. He served as the director of the department of Economics at Mumbai University and was a National Professor of the Government of India. When Centre For Development Alternatives (CFDA) was established in 1998, he became its founder chairperson, a post he held till his death.

Dantwala, who was associated with several global movements in Agricultural Economics, authored several publications on the topic and contributed chapters to several others. Indian Agricultural Development Since Independence, Evaluation of Land Reforms, Poverty in India, Then and Now, 1870-1970, Gandhism Reconsidered and Marketing of Raw Cotton in India are some of his other notable works and he has also edited works such as Dilemmas Of Growth: The Indian Experience and Social Change Through Voluntary Action. He was awarded the civilian honour of the Padma Bhushan by the Government of India in 1969, a year after he was honoured by the Wageningen University and Research Centre, an affiliate of the Wageningen University, with an honorary doctorate, in 1968. He died on 8 October 1998, aged 89. The story of life has been documented in several obituaries, including Remembering M L Dantwala, in the Economic and Political Weekly, and Professor M.L. Dantwala: A Tribute, in Indian Journal of Agricultural Economics, both published in 1998.

Selected bibliography

See also 
 Wilson College, Mumbai
 Wageningen University and Research Centre

References

External links 
 

Recipients of the Padma Bhushan in science & engineering
1909 births
1998 deaths
People from Surat
Scientists from Gujarat
Indian independence activists from Gujarat
Indian agricultural economists
Gandhians
University of Mumbai alumni
Academic staff of the University of Mumbai
Wageningen University and Research
20th-century Indian economists